Denis Kang (born September 17, 1977) is a retired Canadian professional mixed martial artist who most recently competed in the Middleweight division. A professional competitor since 1998, Kang has formerly competed for the UFC, PRIDE, DREAM, Impact FC, M-1 Global, K-1 HERO'S, ROAD FC, and Pancrase. In his prime he was ranked one of the top fighters in the world and scored notable wins over Pat Healy, Marvin Eastman,  Akihiro Gono and Murilo Rua.

Background 
Kang was born in the French overseas collectivity of Saint Pierre and Miquelon to a Korean father and French mother.  He and his family relocated to the Canary Islands and finally North Vancouver, British Columbia, Canada, in 1988 when he was 11 years old. After some years from their arrival to Vancouver, he started taking Hapkido lessons by encouragement of his parents. Kang transitioned into Brazilian Jiu-Jitsu in high school because he wanted to improve in his ground game more than practice self-defense.

Mixed martial arts career

Early career 
Kang's MMA career began in 1998 at the Ultimate Warrior Challenge in Vancouver, British Columbia, Canada. Kang was successful in his debut fight, winning by submission (rear naked choke) over Eric Harcrow. Kang would go on to win his next 2 fights before going 2–5 over his next 8 with one no contest against Dennis Hallman. He would go 7–7 with one no contest in his first 15 fights, with a few convincing defeats.

After winning five of his next six fights, Kang signed a contract with Spirit MC, a South Korea MMA organization. Denis went 5–0 while fighting in Korea and was crowned the Spirit MC Heavyweight Champion.  Following this, Denis relocated to Florida and joined American Top Team.

It was at this time that Kang caught the attention of the PRIDE Fighting Championships. Kang signed a contract with PRIDE and made his debut at PRIDE Bushido 6, where he defeated Japanese opponent Takahiro Oba via armbar at 4:24 of round one. Under the Korean banner, Denis went on to win his next two fights in PRIDE, with a victory coming over Englishman Mark Weir at PRIDE Bushido 10. In between fights for Pride, Denis fought American Albert Basconcelles and knocked him out within 12 seconds of the opening bell.  At Bushido 11, Kang continued his winning streak by knocking out Chute Boxe member Murilo "Ninja" Rua in 15 seconds in the first round of the PRIDE Bushido Welterweight (183 lb) Grand Prix.  At Bushido 12, Denis submitted Armenian Amar Suloev via rear naked choke to advance to the semi-final round of the Welterweight Grand Prix. With this win, Kang was then 18–0–1 in his last 19 contests. However, after advancing through the semi-final round of the Bushido tournament and beating Akihiro Gono on November 5, 2006, he was defeated by Kazuo Misaki in the final at Bushido 13. Kang had torn his right biceps muscle earlier that night in his win over Gono.

Kang had only one match in 2007 after breaking his hand (an injury that will reappear over and over again) in a match against Jungkyu Choi for the Spirit MC Heavyweight Championship on March 11. Kang won via unanimous decision but was unable to compete for several months.

After the contract termination of PRIDE, Kang moved to K-1 Hero's maintaining the championship of Spirit MC. Kang made his K-1 Hero's debut on October 28, 2007, in "K-1 Hero's in Seoul". His opponent was Yoshihiro Akiyama who was returning to MMA after a 10-month suspension. Kang lost via TKO.

Kang next fight was on April 29, 2008, in the opening round of the Dream 2: Middleweight Grand Prix 2008 First Round, losing to Gegard Mousasi via triangle choke.

On August 30, 2008, Kang defended his Spirit MC Heavyweight Championship by defeating Kim Jae Young by TKO due to strikes at 1:31 of the first round.

Kang defeated UFC veteran Marvin Eastman by TKO on October 25, 2008, at "Raw Combat: Redemption" in Calgary, Alberta, Canada.  The fight lasted 48 seconds.

Ultimate Fighting Championship 
Kang made his UFC debut on January 17, 2009, against Alan Belcher despite suffering from ankle injury. Although Kang controlled the fight, he lost by guillotine choke at the end of round two after a takedown attempt.

Kang redeemed  himself with a victory over Xavier Foupa-Pokam at UFC 97 by unanimous decision.

Kang faced Michael Bisping on November 14, 2009, at UFC 105. In an interview about his fight with Bisping, Kang revealed he wanted a title fight with Anderson Silva. Bisping TKO'd Kang in the 2nd round. Even though Bisping was the crowd favorite in his home town Manchester and Kang was being booed on, Kang dropped Bisping with a right hand in the first round. Kang followed Bisping to the floor and attempted submissions, but Bisping defended well and neutralised Kang's attacks despite Kang briefly having full mount. In the 2nd round Bisping secured a single-leg takedown and the momentum of the fight shifted : he unleashed a vicious ground and pound attack on the Canadian, which Kang failed to recover from. The fight was awarded Fight of the Night honours, giving both Kang and Bisping a $40,000 bonus check.

Kang was cut from the UFC on Dec. 9 2009, along with Brock Larson, Rolando Delgado and Jason Dent.  Kang announced that he had signed with W1 MMA, and that he would fight for their vacant middleweight title on December 18, 2010, in Montreal, Quebec.

Post-UFC 
Denis defeated Dae Won Kim at W-1: Judgment day. Kang faced off against former WEC Middleweight Champion Paulo Filho on July 18, 2010, at an Impact Fighting Championships event. The fight was declared a split draw.

Denis joined the Korean MMA promotion ROAD FC by signing a multi-fight non-exclusive deal.

Denis lost to Melvin Manhoef by KO due to a knee to the body early in the first round of their DREAM 18 New Year's Eve fight at the end of 2012.

Personal life
Kang's youngest brother, Julien, is an actor and model in South Korea.

Championships and accomplishments

Mixed martial arts 
PRIDE Fighting Championships
2006 PRIDE Welterweight Grand Prix Runner-Up
Spirit MC
Spirit MC Heavyweight (+80 kg) Championship (One time; Last)
Spirit MC Grand Prix 2004 Championship
Ultimate Fighting Championship
Fight of the Night (One time)
 ROAD FC
Fight of the Night (One time)

Mixed martial arts record 

|-
| Loss
| align=center|  (2)
| Melvin Manhoef
| TKO (knee to the body)
| DREAM 18
| 
| align=center| 1
| align=center| 0:50
| Tokyo, Japan
|
|-
| Win
| align=center| 35–15–2 (2)
| Hae Suk Son
| KO (punches)
| Road FC 8: Bitter Rivals
| 
| align=center| 1
| align=center| 4:57
| Wonju, South Korea
|
|-
| Loss
| align=center| 34–15–2 (2)
| Shungo Oyama
| TKO (knees)
| Road FC 5: Night of Champions
| 
| align=center| 1
| align=center| 4:30
| Seoul, South Korea
|
|-
| Loss
| align=center| 34–14–2 (2)
| Seung Bae Whi
| TKO (knees)
| Road FC 3: Explosion
| 
| align=center| 2
| align=center| 3:58
| Seoul, South Korea
|
|-
| Loss
| align=center| 34–13–2 (2)
| Jesse Taylor
| Submission (rear-naked choke)
| Battlefield Fight League 8: Island Beatdown
| 
| align=center| 1
| align=center| 1:57
| Nanaimo, British Columbia, Canada
|
|-
| Win
| align=center| 34–12–2 (2)
| Eun Soo Lee
| Decision (unanimous)
| Road FC 2: Alive
| 
| align=center| 3
| align=center| 5:00
| Seoul, South Korea
| 
|-
| Draw
| align=center| 33–12–2 (2)
| Paulo Filho
| Draw (split)
| Impact FC 2
| 
| align=center| 3
| align=center| 5:00
| Sydney, Australia
|
|-
| Win
| align=center| 33–12–1 (2)
| Dae Won Kim
| Submission (arm-triangle choke)
| W-1: Judgment day
| 
| align=center| 1
| align=center| 1:49
| Laval, Quebec, Canada
|
|-
| Loss
| align=center| 32–12–1 (2)
| Michael Bisping
| TKO (knees to the body & punches)
| UFC 105
| 
| align=center| 2
| align=center| 4:24
| Manchester, England
| 
|-
| Win
| align=center| 32–11–1 (2)
| Xavier Foupa-Pokam
| Decision (unanimous)
| UFC 97
| 
| align=center| 3
| align=center| 5:00
| Montreal, Quebec, Canada
|
|-
| Loss
| align=center| 31–11–1 (2)
| Alan Belcher
| Submission (guillotine choke)
| UFC 93
| 
| align=center| 2
| align=center| 4:36
| Dublin, Ireland
|
|-
| Win
| align=center| 31–10–1 (2)
| Marvin Eastman
| KO (punches)
| Raw Combat: Redemption
| 
| align=center| 1
| align=center| 0:48
| Calgary, Alberta, Canada
|
|-
| Win
| align=center| 30–10–1 (2)
| Jae Young Kim
| KO (punches and stomp)
| Spirit MC
| 
| align=center| 1
| align=center| 1:13
| Seoul, South Korea
| 
|-
| Loss
| align=center| 29–10–1 (2)
| Gegard Mousasi
| Submission (triangle choke)
| Dream 2: Middleweight Grand Prix 2008 First Round
| 
| align=center| 1
| align=center| 3:10
| Saitama, Japan
| 
|-
| Loss
| align=center| 29–9–1 (2)
| Yoshihiro Akiyama
| KO (punches)
| Hero's 2007 in Korea
| 
| align=center| 1
| align=center| 4:45
| Seoul, South Korea
|
|-
| Win
| align=center| 29–8–1 (2)
| Jung Gyu Choi
| Decision (majority)
| Spirit MC
| 
| align=center| 3
| align=center| 5:00
| Seoul, South Korea
| 
|-
| Loss
| align=center| 28–8–1 (2)
| Kazuo Misaki
| Decision (split)
| PRIDE Bushido 13
| 
| align=center| 3
| align=center| 5:00
| Yokohama, Japan
| 
|-
| Win
| align=center| 28–7–1 (2)
| Akihiro Gono
| Decision (unanimous)
| PRIDE Bushido 13
| 
| align=center| 2
| align=center| 5:00
| Yokohama, Japan
| 
|-
| Win
| align=center| 27–7–1 (2)
| Amar Suloev
| Submission (one-arm strangle)
| PRIDE Bushido 12
| 
| align=center| 1
| align=center| 4:10
| Nagoya, Japan
| 
|-
| Win
| align=center| 26–7–1 (2)
| Murilo Rua
| KO (punches)
| PRIDE Bushido 11
| 
| align=center| 1
| align=center| 0:15
| Saitama, Japan
| 
|-
| Win
| align=center| 25–7–1 (2)
| Albert Basconcelles
| TKO (punches)
| Spirit MC
| 
| align=center| 1
| align=center| 0:12
| Seoul, South Korea
|
|-
| Win
| align=center| 24–7–1 (2)
| Mark Weir
| TKO (submission to knees)
| PRIDE Bushido 10
| 
| align=center| 1
| align=center| 4:55
| Tokyo, Japan
|
|-
| Win
| align=center| 23–7–1 (2)
| Ron Fields
| Submission (rear-naked choke)
| Absolute Fighting Championships 14
| 
| align=center| 1
| align=center| 2:46
| Fort Lauderdale, Florida, United States
|
|-
| NC
| align=center| 22–7–1 (2)
| Robert Villegas
| No Contest
| Spirit MC
| 
| align=center| 1
| align=center| 0:00
| Seoul, South Korea
|
|-
| Win
| align=center| 22–7–1 (1)
| Andrei Semenov
| Decision (unanimous)
| PRIDE Bushido 8
| 
| align=center| 2
| align=center| 5:00
| Nagoya, Japan
|
|-
| Win
| align=center| 21–7–1 (1)
| Takahiro Oba
| Submission (armbar)
| PRIDE Bushido 6
| 
| align=center| 1
| align=center| 4:24
| Yokohama, Japan
|
|-
| Win
| align=center| 20–7–1 (1)
| Alexei Vezelozorov
| Submission (choke)
| M-1 MFC: Heavyweight GP
| 
| align=center| 1
| align=center| 1:17
| Moscow, Russia
|
|-
| Win
| align=center| 19–7–1 (1)
| Jin Ho Yang
| TKO (punches)
| Spirit MC
| 
| align=center| 1
| align=center| 0:49
| Seoul, South Korea
| 
|-
| Win
| align=center| 18–7–1 (1)
| Jae Young Kim
| Submission (arm-triangle choke)
| Spirit MC
| 
| align=center| 1
| align=center| 1:38
| Seoul, South Korea
| 
|-
| Win
| align=center| 17–7–1 (1)
| Junpei Hamada
| Submission (armbar)
| Spirit MC
| 
| align=center| 1
| align=center| 2:35
| Seoul, South Korea
| 
|-
| Win
| align=center| 16–7–1 (1)
| Kobus Huisamen
| TKO (punches)
| Spirit MC
| 
| align=center| 1
| align=center| 1:06
| Seoul, South Korea
|
|-
| Win
| align=center| 15–7–1 (1)
| Hyun Chul Cho
| Submission (rear-naked choke)
| Spirit MC
| 
| align=center| 1
| align=center| 2:06
| Seoul, South Korea
|
|-
| Win
| align=center| 14–7–1 (1)
| Hyung Jun Kim
| TKO (punches)
| Spirit MC
| 
| align=center| 1
| align=center| 1:13
| Seoul, South Korea
|
|-
| Win
| align=center| 13–7–1 (1)
| Jae Young Kim
| TKO (punches)
| Spirit MC
| 
| align=center| 1
| align=center| 0:38
| Seoul, South Korea
|
|-
| Draw
| align=center| 12–7–1 (1)
| Andrei Semenov
| Draw
| M-1 MFC: Russia vs. The World 7
| 
| align=center| 1
| align=center| 10:00
| St. Petersburg, Russia
|
|-
| Win
| align=center| 12–7 (1)
| Stephan Potvin
| TKO (punches)
| TKO Major League MMA
| 
| align=center| 3
| align=center| 2:22
| Montreal, Quebec, Canada
|
|-
| Win
| align=center| 11–7 (1)
| Kaipo Kalama
| Decision (majority)
| SB 30: Collision Course
| 
| align=center| 3
| align=center| 3:00
| Honolulu, Hawaii, United States
|
|-
| Win
| align=center| 10–7 (1)
| Brendan Seguin
| Submission (armbar)
| SB 30: Collision Course
| 
| align=center| 1
| align=center| 2:24
| Honolulu, Hawaii, United States
|
|-
| Win
| align=center| 9–7 (1)
| Keith Rockel
| KO (punch)
| USMMA 3: Ring of Fury
| 
| align=center| 2
| align=center| 2:59
| Boston, Massachusetts, United States
|
|-
| Win
| align=center| 8–7 (1)
| Chris Peak
| Submission (rear-naked choke)
| World Freestyle Fighting 4
| 
| align=center| 1
| align=center| 0:57
| Kelowna, British Columbia, Canada
|
|-
| Loss
| align=center| 7–7 (1)
| Jason Miller
| Submission (rear-naked choke)
| Extreme Challenge 50
| 
| align=center| 2
| align=center| 1:41
| Salt Lake City, Utah, United States
|
|-
| Loss
| align=center| 7–6 (1)
| Joe Doerksen
| Submission (triangle choke)
| UCC 11: The Next Level
| 
| align=center| 1
| align=center| 4:49
| Montreal, Quebec, Canada
|
|-
| Win
| align=center| 7–5 (1)
| Pat Healy
| Submission (guillotine choke)
| Rumble in the Ring 7
| 
| align=center| 1
| align=center| 3:42
| Auburn, Washington, United States
|
|-
| Win
| align=center| 6–5 (1)
| Shane Biever
| Submission (armlock)
| World Freestyle Fighting 2
| 
| align=center| 1
| align=center| 3:03
| Kelowna, British Columbia, Canada
|
|-
| NC
| align=center| 5–5 (1)
| Dennis Hallman
| No Contest
| World Freestyle Fighting 1
| 
| align=center| 2
| align=center| 3:15
| Kelowna, British Columbia, Canada
| 
|-
| Loss
| align=center| 5–5
| Marty Armendarez
| TKO (punches)
| IFC WC 15: Warriors Challenge 15
| 
| align=center| 3
| align=center| 3:45
| Oroville, California, United States
|
|-
| Loss
| align=center| 5–4
| Osami Shibuya
| Submission (rear-naked choke)
| Pancrase: Proof 3
| 
| align=center| 1
| align=center| 3:52
| Tokyo, Japan
|
|-
| Loss
| align=center| 5–3
| Keiichiro Yamamiya
| Decision (majority)
| Pancrase: Trans 7
| 
| align=center| 2
| align=center| 3:00
| Tokyo, Japan
|
|-
| Win
| align=center| 5–2
| Minoru Suzuki
| TKO (back injury)
| Pancrase: 2000 Anniversary Show
| 
| align=center| 1
| align=center| 3:43
| Yokohama, Japan
|
|-
| Win
| align=center| 4–2
| Lonnie Canida
| TKO (punches)
| Western Canada's Toughest
| 
| align=center| 1
| align=center| 4:06
| Kelowna, British Columbia, Canada
|
|-
| Loss
| align=center| 3–2
| Joe Slick
| Submission (arm-triangle choke)
| Extreme Challenge 24
| 
| align=center| 1
| align=center| 5:53
| Salt Lake City, Utah, United States
|
|-
| Loss
| align=center| 3–1
| Jacen Flynn
| Submission (guillotine choke)
| rowspan=2|Bas Rutten Invitational 2
| rowspan=2|
| align=center| 1
| align=center| 4:07
| rowspan=2|Littleton, Colorado, United States
|
|-
| Win
| align=center| 3–0
| Tom Bolger
| Submission (triangle choke)
| align=center| 1
| align=center| 1:55
|
|-
| Win
| align=center| 2–0
| Fadi Habib
| TKO (punches)
| Ultimate Warrior Challenge 2
| 
| align=center| 1
| align=center| 0:53
| Vancouver, British Columbia, Canada
|
|-
| Win
| align=center| 1–0
| Eric Harcrow
| Submission (rear-naked choke)
| Ultimate Warrior Challenge
| 
| align=center| 1
| align=center| 0:15
| Vancouver, British Columbia, Canada
|

Kickboxing record 

Legend:

Submission grappling record

See also 
List of male mixed martial artists
List of Brazilian jiu-jitsu practitioners
List of Canadian UFC fighters

References

External links 
 Official website
 
 

1977 births
Living people
Canadian male kickboxers
Canadian male mixed martial artists
Canadian sportspeople of Korean descent
Canadian practitioners of Brazilian jiu-jitsu
Canadian submission wrestlers
Franco-Columbian people
Middleweight mixed martial artists
Light heavyweight mixed martial artists
Heavyweight kickboxers
Heavyweight mixed martial artists
Mixed martial artists utilizing taekwondo
Mixed martial artists utilizing hapkido
Mixed martial artists utilizing karate
People from North Vancouver
People from Saint Pierre and Miquelon
French emigrants to Canada
Sportspeople from British Columbia
People awarded a black belt in Brazilian jiu-jitsu
Ultimate Fighting Championship male fighters
Hapkido practitioners